The Securities Acts Amendments of 1975 is an act of Congress. It was passed as a United States Public Law on June 4, 1975, and amended the Securities Act of 1933 ( et seq.) and the Securities Exchange Act of 1934 ( et seq.).  The Securities Acts Amendments imposed an obligation on the Securities and Exchange Commission to consider the impacts that any new regulation would have on competition.  The law also empowered the Securities and Exchange Commission (SEC) to establish a national market system and a system for nationwide clearance and settlement of securities transactions, enabling the SEC to enact Regulation NMS, and created the Municipal Securities Rulemaking Board (MSRB), a self-regulatory organization that writes investor protection rules and other rules regulating broker-dealers and banks in the United States municipal securities market.

References

See also
National Market System

United States federal securities legislation